Li Xiaoxu is a Chinese basketball player who currently plays for Liaoning Flying Leopards in the Chinese Basketball Association.

Career statistics

CBA statistics

References

1990 births
Living people
Power forwards (basketball)
Liaoning Flying Leopards players
Chinese men's basketball players
Olympic basketball players of China
Sportspeople from Anshan
Basketball players from Liaoning
Asian Games medalists in basketball
Basketball players at the 2010 Asian Games
Basketball players at the 2014 Asian Games
Asian Games gold medalists for China
Medalists at the 2010 Asian Games
20th-century Chinese people
21st-century Chinese people